El Mahdy Soliman (born 30 November 1986) is an Egyptian footballer who plays as a goalkeeper for the Egyptian Premier League side Pyramids FC.

References

1986 births
Living people
Egyptian footballers
Association football goalkeepers
Al Mokawloon Al Arab SC players
Petrojet SC players
Ghazl El Mahalla SC players
Smouha SC players
Pyramids FC players
Egyptian Premier League players
ENPPI SC players